The discography of Wednesday Campanella contains 2 studio albums, 1 soundtrack, 14 extended plays and 11 singles.

Studio albums

Soundtracks

Extended plays

Compilation extended plays

Singles

As a lead artist

As a featured artist

Promotional singles

Guest appearances

Notes

References

Discographies of Japanese artists
Electronic music discographies
Pop music discographies